Eutrochium purpureum, commonly known as purple Joe-Pye weed or sweetscented joe pye weed, is an herbaceous perennial plant in the family Asteraceae. It is native to eastern and central North America, from Ontario east to New Hampshire and south as far as Florida, Louisiana, and Oklahoma.

Description
Plants are found in full sun to part shade in mesic to wet soils. Stems are upright, thick, round, and purple, with whorls of leaves at each node. As the plant begins to bloom the stems often bend downward under the weight of the flowers. The purplish flowers are produced in large loose, convex shaped compound corymbiform arrays. Plants bloom mid to late summer and attract much activity from insects that feed on the nectar produced by the flowers.

Taxonomy
Eutrochium purpureum shows a high amount of variability, and up to two or three varieties are currently recognized by current botanical authorities. They differ based in leaf shape, leaf pubescence, and achene glandularity. The precise delineation of these varieties is difficult due to integration between them. The commonly recognized varieties are:
Eutrochium purpureum var. carolinianum- Southeastern Piedmont
Eutrochium purpureum var. holzingeri-  Midwestern
Eutrochium purpureum var. purpureum- Widespread in eastern North America

This species hybridizes readily with other species of Eutrochium and where this species and those species overlap in distribution the resulting plants can be difficult to resolve to a specific taxon.

Ecology
Many species of butterflies, moths, bees, and flies visit the flowers.

It is larval host to the eupatorium borer moth (Carmenta bassiformis), the red groundling moth (Perigea xanthioides), the ruby tiger moth (Phragmatobia fuliginosa), and the three-lined flower moth (Schinia trifascia).

The larvae of Calycomyza flavinotum, a leaf miner fly, create blotch-shaped mines on the leaves.

Cultivation
Eutrochium purpureum is sometimes cultivated and has escaped from cultivation in parts of New Zealand.

References

purpureum
Flora of the Northeastern United States
Plants described in 1753
Taxa named by Carl Linnaeus
Flora of the Southeastern United States
Flora of the North-Central United States
Flora of Eastern Canada
Flora without expected TNC conservation status